Paolo is both a given name and a surname, the Italian form of the name Paul. Notable people with the name include:

People with the given name Paolo

Art
Paolo Alboni (1671–1734), Italian painter
Paolo Abbate (1884–1973), Italian-American sculptor
Paolo Antonio Barbieri (1603–1649), Italian painter
Paolo Buggiani (born 1933), Italian contemporary artist
Paolo Carosone (born 1941), Italian painter and sculptor
Paolo Moranda Cavazzola (1486–1522), Italian painter
Paolo Farinati (c. 1524–c. 1606), Italian painter
Paolo Fiammingo (c. 1540–1596), Flemish painter
Paolo Domenico Finoglia (c. 1590–1645), Italian painter
Paolo Grilli (1857–1952), Italian sculptor and painter
Paolo de Matteis (1662–1728), Italian painter
Paolo Monaldi, Italian painter
Paolo Pagani (1655–1716), Italian painter
Paolo Persico (c. 1729–1796), Italian sculptor
Paolo Pino (1534–1565), Italian painter
Paolo Gerolamo Piola (1666–1724), Italian painter
Paolo Porpora (1617–1673), Italian painter
Paolo Romano, Italian sculptor
Paolo Sarti, Italian painter
Paolo Schmidlin (born 1964), Italian sculptor
Paolo Uccello (1397–1475), Italian painter
Paolo Veneziano, Italian painter
Paolo Veronese (1528–1588), Italian painter

Business
Paolo Cuccia (born 1953), Italian businessman
Paolo Pininfarina (born 1958), Italian businessman and engineer
Paolo Zampolli (born 1970), Italian businessman

Film and television
Paolo Ballesteros (born 1982), Filipino actor and television personality
Paolo Bediones (born 1974), Filipino newscaster and television host
Paolo Bonacelli (born 1937), Italian actor
Paolo Bonolis (born 1961), Italian television personality
Paolo Carlini (1922–1979), Italian actor
Paolo Contis (born 1984), Filipino actor and comedian
Paolo Andrea Di Pietro (born 1986), Italian actor and singer
Paolo Montalbán (born 1973), Filipino-American actor
Pier Paolo Pasolini (1922–1975), Italian film director
Paolo Seganti (born 1964), Italian actor
Paolo Sorrentino (born 1970), Italian film director

Government and politics
Paolo Borsellino (1940–1992), Italian judge
Paolo Boselli (1838–1932), Italian politician
Paolo Calcinaro (born 1977), Italian politician
Paolo Cappa (1888–1956), Italian journalist, lawyer and politician
Paolo Duterte (born 1975), Filipino politician
Paolo Romani (born 1947), Italian politician
Paolo Ruggiero (born 1957), Italian general

Literature
Paolo Berlusconi (born 1949), Italian publisher
Paolo Cognetti (born 1978), Italian writer
Paolo Giordano (born 1982), Italian writer
Paolo Volponi (1924–1994), Italian writer

Music
Paolo Achenza, Italian jazz pianist
Paolo Buonvino (born 1968), Italian composer
Paolo Conte (born 1937), Italian singer
Paolo Andrea Di Pietro (born 1986), Italian opera singer
Paolo Fresu (born 1961), Italian musician
Paolo Meneguzzi (born 1976), Swiss-Italian singer
Paolo Montarsolo (1925–2006), Italian opera singer
Paolo Nutini (born 1987), Scottish singer
Paolo Rustichelli (born 1953), Italian musician
Paolo Silveri (1913–2001), Italian opera singer
Paolo Vallesi (born 1964), Italian singer-songwriter

Religion
Paolo Alberi, Roman Catholic archbishop
Paolo Angelo Ballerini (1814–1897), Italian Roman Catholic archbishop
Paolo Bertoli (1908–2001), Italian cardinal
Paolo Burali d'Arezzo (1511–1578), Italian cardinal
Paolo Emilio Cesi (1481–1537), Italian cardinal
Paolo Dall'Oglio (born 1954), Italian Jesuit priest
Paolo Dezza (1901–1999), Italian cardinal
Paolo di Campofregoso (1427–1498), Italian Roman Catholic archbishop
Paolo Giobbe (1880–1972), Italian cardinal
Paolo Marella (1895–1984), Italian cardinal
Paolo Pezzi (born 1960), Italian Roman Catholic archbishop
Paolo Romeo (born 1938), Italian cardinal
Paolo Sardi (1934–2019), Italian cardinal
Paolo Segneri (1624–1694), Italian Jesuit priest
Paolo Emilio Sfondrati (1560–1618), Italian cardinal

Science and medicine
Paolo Chiavenna, Italian astronomer
Paolo Macchiarini (born 1958), Italian surgeon
Paolo Sassone-Corsi (1956–2020), Italian molecular biologist

Sports
Paolo Bacchini (born 1985), Italian figure skater
Paolo Banchero (born 2002), Italian-American basketball player
Paolo Bertolucci (born 1951), Italian tennis player
Paolo Boi (1528–1598), Italian chess player
Paolo Bossini (born 1985), Italian swimmer
Paolo Camossi (born 1974), Italian triple jumper
Paolo Casarsa (born 1975), Italian decathlete
Paolo Cecconi (1953–2016), Italian footballer
Paolo Di Girolamo (born 1994), Italian rower
Paolo Grecucci (born 1952), Italian racewalker
Paolo Lorenzi (born 1981), Italian tennis player
Paolo Pizzo (born 1983), Italian fencer

Football

A–E
Paolo Acerbis (born 1981), Italian footballer
Paolo Agosteo (1908–2008), Italian footballer
Paolo Alcocer (born 2000), footballer
Paolo Agabitini (born 1959), Italian footballer
Paolo Baiocco (born 1989), Italian footballer
Paolo Baldieri (born 1965), Italian footballer
Paolo Barison (1936–1979), Italian footballer
Paolo Bellucci (born 1986), Italian footballer
Paolo Bianco (born 1977), Italian footballer and manager
Paolo Borelli (born 1958), Italian footballer
Paolo Branduani (born 1989), Italian footballer
Paolo Bugas (born 1994), Filipino footballer
Paolo Campinoti (born 1990), Italian footballer
Paolo Di Canio (born 1968), Italian football manager
Paolo Cannavaro (born 1981), Italian footballer
Paolo Carbonaro (born 1989), Italian footballer
Paolo Carbone (born 1982), Italian footballer
Paolo Cardozo (born 1989), Uruguayan footballer
Paolo Castellazzi (born 1987), Italian footballer
Paolo Castelli (born 1980), Italian footballer
Paolo Castellini (born 1979), Italian footballer
Paolo Cimpiel (born 1940), Italian footballer
Paolo Conti (born 1950), Italian footballer
Paolo Dametto (born 1993), Italian footballer
Paolo De Ceglie (born 1986), Italian footballer
Paolo Dellafiore (born 1985), Argentine-born Italian footballer

F–M
Paolo Facchinetti (born 1984), Italian footballer
Paolo Alberto Faccini (born 1961), Italian footballer
Paolo Faragò (born 1993), Italian footballer
Paolo Farinola (born 1984), Brazilian-born Greek footballer
Paolo Fernandes (born 1998), Spanish footballer
Paolo Foglio (born 1975), Italian footballer
Paolo Frangipane (born 1979), Argentine footballer
Paolo Frascatore (born 1992), Italian footballer
Paolo Dal Fiume (born 1953), Italian footballer
Paolo Ghiglione (born 1997), Italian footballer
Paolo Gigantelli (born 1979), Swiss footballer
Paolo Ginestra (born 1979), Italian footballer
Paolo Giovannelli (born 1960), Italian footballer
Paolo Goltz (born 1985), Argentine footballer
Paolo Gozzi (born 2001), Italian footballer
Paolo Grillo (born 1997), Italian footballer
Paolo Guastalvino (born 1979), Italian footballer
Paolo Guerrero (born 1984), Peruvian footballer
Paolo de la Haza (born 1983), Peruvian footballer
Paolo Hurtado (born 1990), Peruvian footballer
Paolo Ivani (born 1997), Albanian footballer
Paolo Jacobini (1919–2003), Italian footballer
Paolo Maino (born 1989), Italian footballer
Paolo Maldini (born 1968), Italian footballer
Paolo Marchi (born 1991), Italian footballer
Paolo Mariotti (born 1979), Sammarinese footballer
Paolo Mastrantonio (born 1967), Italian footballer
Paolo Mavolo (born 1992), Hungarian footballer
Paolo Mazza (1901–1981), Italian football manager
Paolo Mazzoleni (born 1974), Italian football referee
Paolo Medina (born 1999), Mexican footballer
Paolo Monelli (born 1963), Italian footballer
Paolo Montagna (born 1976), Sammarinese footballer
Paolo Montero (born 1971), Uruguayan footballer and manager

N–Z
Paolo Negro (born 1972), Italian footballer and manager
Paolo Orlandoni (born 1972), Italian footballer
Paolo Ortiz (born 1985), Paraguayan footballer
Paolo Patrucchi (born 1908), Italian footballer
Paolo Pellicanò (born 1995), Italian footballer
Paolo Pestrin (1936–2009), Italian footballer
Paolo Poggi (born 1971), Italian footballer
Paolo Ponzo (1972–2013), Italian footballer
Paolo Pulici (born 1950), Italian footballer and manager
Paolo Regoli (born 1991), Italian footballer
Paolo Ríos (born 2000), Mexican footballer
Paolo Rizzi (born 1969), Italian footballer
Paolo Rozzio (born 1992), Italian footballer
Paolo Sabak (born 1999), Belgian footballer
Paolo Sammarco (born 1983), Italian footballer
Pier Paolo Scarrone (born 1951), Italian footballer
Paolo Seppani (born 1986), Italian footballer
Paolo Signorelli (1939–2018), Italian footballer
Paolo Sirena (born 1945), Italian footballer
Paolo Sollier (born 1948), Italian footballer and manager
Paolo Stringara (born 1962), Italian footballer and manager
Paolo Suárez (born 1980), Uruguayan-Salvadoran footballer
Paolo Tagliavento (born 1972), Italian football referee
Paolo Todeschini (1920–1993), Italian footballer and manager
Paolo Tornaghi (born 1988), Italian footballer
Paolo Tramezzani (born 1970), Italian footballer and manager
Paolo Valagussa (born 1993), Italian footballer 
Paolo Vanoli (born 1972), Italian footballer
Paolo Vernazza (born 1979), English footballer
Paolo Viganò (1950–2014), Italian footballer
Paolo Yrizar (born 1997), Mexican footballer
Paolo Ziliani (born 1971), Italian footballer

Other
Paolo Brera (1949–2019), Italian economist
Paolo Grossi (disambiguation), several people
Paolo Hewitt, English music journalist
Paolo Malatesta ( – 1285), best known for the story of his affair with Francesca da Polenta, portrayed by Dante in the Inferno
Paolo Renda, Italian-Canadian mobster
Paolo Rossi (disambiguation), several people
Paolo Ruffini (1765–1822), Italian mathematician
Paolo Soleri (1919–2013), Italian architect

People with the surname Paolo
Connor Paolo (born 1990), American actor

Fictional characters
Paolo, in the Dune universe
Paolo, a character appearing in several Friends Season One episodes as Rachel's boyfriend

Italian masculine given names
Italian-language surnames
Sammarinese given names